The 30th Goya Awards were presented at the Madrid Marriott Auditorium Hotel in Madrid on February 6, 2016 to honour the best in Spanish films of 2015. Actor and comedian Dani Rovira was the master of ceremonies for the second time in a row. 

Nominations were announced on 14 December 2015 by Asier Etxeandia and Emma Suárez. The Bride received the most nominations with twelve, followed by Nobody Wants the Night with nine nominations.

Truman won five awards including Best Film and Best Director for Cesc Gay.

Winners and nominees

Major awards

Other award nominees

Honorary Goya
Mariano Ozores

Films with multiple nominations and awards 

The following films received multiple nominations:

The following films received multiple awards:

In Memoriam
The segment paid tribute to following seventy artists in the montage:

References

External links
Official site

30
2015 film awards
2015 in Spanish cinema
2016 in Madrid